Juan Francisco Mattia (born 24 June 1988) is an Argentine professional footballer who plays as a centre-back for Primera Nacional side Alvarado.

Career
Mattia started off his career in Primera B Metropolitana with Flandria in 2006. Five years later, after three goals in one hundred appearances for the club, Mattia left Flandria to join San Martín of the Argentine Primera División on loan. His debut arrived on 26 November 2011 during a 0–3 win away to Olimpo. In June 2013, San Martín signed Mattia permanently. On 4 August, Mattia scored his first club goal versus Aldosivi in Primera B Nacional; following relegation in the previous season. In his first seven seasons, he made one hundred and forty-two appearances and scored four times for San Martín in all competitions.

After 10 years at San Martín SJ, Mattia joined Primera Nacional side Alvarado ahead of the 2022 season.

Career statistics
.

References

External links

1988 births
Living people
People from Luján, Buenos Aires
Argentine footballers
Association football defenders
Argentine Primera División players
Primera Nacional players
Flandria footballers
San Martín de San Juan footballers
Club Atlético Alvarado players
Sportspeople from Buenos Aires Province